Leungo Scotch (born 28 February 1996) is a Botswana sprinter.

He set a new personal best of 45.27s to win the men's 400 metres event at 2019 African Games in Rabat, Morocco.

References

External links
 

Botswana male sprinters
African Games gold medalists for Botswana
African Games medalists in athletics (track and field)
Athletes (track and field) at the 2019 African Games
1996 births
Living people
African Games gold medalists in athletics (track and field)
Athletes (track and field) at the 2020 Summer Olympics
Olympic athletes of Botswana
African Championships in Athletics winners
Commonwealth Games silver medallists for Botswana
Commonwealth Games medallists in athletics
Athletes (track and field) at the 2022 Commonwealth Games
Medallists at the 2022 Commonwealth Games